The 2007–08 Serie A season was the 74th season of the Serie A, the top level of ice hockey in Italy. Nine teams participated in the league, and HC Bolzano won the championship by defeating SV Ritten in the final.

First round

Second round

Placing round

Qualification round

Playoffs

Quarterfinals

Semifinals

Final

External links
 Season on hockeyarchives.info  

Serie A (ice hockey) seasons
Italy
2007–08 in Italian ice hockey